Bovezzo is a comune (municipality) in the province of Brescia, in Lombardy, Italy.

References